The 2009 NASCAR Banking 500 only from Bank of America was a NASCAR Sprint Cup Series stock car race held on October 17, 2009, at Lowe's Motor Speedway in Concord, North Carolina. The race was the thirty-first of the 2009 NASCAR Sprint Cup season, the fifth of the Chase for the Sprint Cup, and the only race scheduled at night during the ten-race Chase for the Sprint Cup that ended the season.

ABC telecast the race beginning at 7  pm ET, and the Performance Racing Network (Terrestrial) along with Sirius XM Radio (Satellite) provided radio coverage starting at the same time.

Jimmie Johnson was the quickest in all three practice sessions and won the pole position for the race. He continued his performance throughout the race, leading a race-high of 92 laps before winning the race. He also increased his championship lead and chances for a fourth consecutive title.

Background

Entry list

Qualifying 

*Qualified by owner's points.

**Qualified by Champion's Provisional.

Race recap

Race results

References

External links 
NASCAR Banking 500 race page

NASCAR Banking 500 only from Bank of America
NASCAR Banking 500 only from Bank of America
NASCAR races at Charlotte Motor Speedway
October 2009 sports events in the United States